Świercze is a village in the administrative district of Gmina Zbuczyn, within Siedlce County, Masovian Voivodeship, in east-central Poland.

The village has a population of 40.

References

Villages in Siedlce County